CKBG-FM was a Canadian commercial radio station, which operated at 107.3 FM in Middle Musquodoboit, Nova Scotia. The station is called "CKBG 107.3 FM Blue Garage Classic Mix" and offered news and sports, a mix of rock, classic rock, oldies and country music.

Owned by Blue Garage Broadcasting, the station received CRTC approval on March 2, 2010.

Closure
On September 17, 2012, Paul Blackmore, owner of CKBG-FM, received approval to "revoke" CKBG-FM's broadcasting licence. The licensee stated that the undertaking is no longer in operation due to economic reasons.

References

External links
107.3 FM Blue Garage Classic Mix
 

Radio stations established in 2010
Radio stations disestablished in 2012
KBG
KBG
KBG
2010 establishments in Nova Scotia
2012 disestablishments in Nova Scotia
KBG-FM